Ron Wetzel may refer to:
Ron Wetzel (American football) (born 1960), American football player
Ron Wetzel (Australian footballer) (born 1947), Australian footballer